The 1998-99 Luxembourg Championship season was the third season of Luxembourg's hockey league. Four teams participated in the league, and Tornado Luxembourg won the championship.

Regular season

References

Luxembourg Championship
Luxembourg Championship (ice hockey) seasons